Niva is a rural locality (a khutor) in Prokhorovsky District, Belgorod Oblast, Russia. The population was 10 as of 2010. There is 1 street.

Geography 
Niva is located 5 km east of Prokhorovka (the district's administrative centre) by road. Tikhaya Padina is the nearest rural locality.

References 

Rural localities in Prokhorovsky District